The Book of Abraham is a work produced between 1835 and 1842 by the Latter Day Saints (LDS) movement founder Joseph Smith that he said was based on Egyptian papyri purchased from a traveling mummy exhibition. According to Smith, the book was "a translation of some ancient records ... purporting to be the writings of Abraham, while he was in Egypt, called the Book of Abraham, written by his own hand, upon papyrus". The work was first published in 1842 and today is a canonical part of the Pearl of Great Price. Since its printing, the Book of Abraham has been a source of controversy. Numerous non-LDS Egyptologists, beginning in the mid-19th century, have heavily criticized Joseph Smith's translation and explanations of the facsimiles, unanimously concluding that his interpretations are inaccurate. They have also asserted that missing portions of the facsimiles were reconstructed incorrectly by Smith.

The controversy intensified in the late 1960s when portions of the Joseph Smith Papyri were located. Translations of the papyri revealed the rediscovered portions bore no relation to the Book of Abraham text. LDS apologist Hugh Nibley and Brigham Young University Egyptologists John L. Gee and Michael D. Rhodes subsequently offered detailed rebuttals to some criticisms. University of Chicago Egyptologist Robert K. Ritner concluded in 2014 that the source of the Book of Abraham "is the 'Breathing Permit of Hôr,' misunderstood and mistranslated by Joseph Smith." He later said the Book of Abraham is now "confirmed as a perhaps well-meaning, but erroneous invention by Joseph Smith," and "despite its inauthenticity as a genuine historical narrative, the Book of Abraham remains a valuable witness to early American religious history and to the recourse to ancient texts as sources of modern religious faith and speculation."

Background

The Book of Abraham is an 1842 work produced by Latter Day Saints (LDS) movement founder Joseph Smith that he claimed were translated from Egyptian papyri purchased from a traveling mummy exhibition. According to Smith, the book comprised "ancient records ... purporting to be the writings of Abraham, while he was in Egypt, called the Book of Abraham, written by his own hand, upon papyrus". The book has five chapters, and is often accompanied by three "facsimiles", or reproductions of vignettes which were copied from the original papyri. According to Smith's explanations, Facsimile No. 1 depicts Abraham bound to a sacrificial altar, with the "idolatrous priest of Elkenah" looming over him with a knife; Facsimile No. 2 is a circular depiction of the heavens (featuring planets, stars, the sun and moon, and other celestial objects) that also contains the grand key-words of the holy priesthood; and Facsimile No. 3 portrays Abraham in the court of Pharaoh "reasoning upon the principles of Astronomy".

The Book of Abraham text is a source for a number of distinct Latter Day Saint doctrines, which Mormon author Randal S. Chase calls "truths of the gospel of Jesus Christ that were previously unknown to Church members of Joseph Smith's day." Examples include the nature of the priesthood, an understanding of the cosmos, the exaltation of humanity, pre-mortal existence and the first and second estates, and the plurality of gods.

Joseph Smith papyri and Kirtland Egyptian papers

Sometime between 1817 and 1822, several Ptolemaic era fragments of papyri and eleven mummies were discovered by Antonio Lebolo in the ancient Egyptian city of Thebes. By the summer of 1835 they had made their way into the possession of Michael Chandler, who displayed them in Kirtland, Ohio, which at the time was the home of the Latter Day Saints, led by Joseph Smith. In 1830 Smith published a religious text called the Book of Mormon, which he said he translated from writings inscribed on golden plates written in what the book calls "reformed Egyptian". Chandler advertised to those in Kirtland by creating a leaflet stating that the mummies "may have lived in the days of Jacob, Moses, or David". When Smith examined the scrolls, he said that they contained the writings of Abraham and Joseph (as well as a story about an "Egyptian princess" named "Katumin" or "Kah tou mun"). The four mummies and papyrus documents were purchased by Smith and a few others, and Smith with the help of scribes began "translating an alphabet to the Book of Abraham, and arranging a grammar of the Egyptian language as practiced by the ancients."

The collection of manuscripts Smith and his scribes produced is now known as the Kirtland Egyptian papers. One of the manuscripts in this collection was a bound book simply titled "Grammar & A[l]phabet of the Egyptian Language" (GAEL), which contained Smith's interpretations of the Egyptian glyphs. This manuscript details Smith's belief that hieroglyphics had five "degrees" of interpretation, with each "degree" representing a deeper, expanded, and more complex level of interpretation. This manuscript illustrates Smith's method for translating the papyri: The scribes sketched out the hieroglyphic characters from the papyri onto the left-hand side of the manuscript. Smith then gave his English translation of the glyph, along with an explanation for how one would pronounce the character.

Smith believed and taught that the papyri had been written by Biblical patriarchs themselves, and not by a later Egyptian scribe or a Jewish redactor. In the article "Truth Will Prevail" published in the Latter Day Saint movement newspaper Times and Seasons, Smith wrote, "The Book of Abraham [was] written by his [i.e. Abraham's] own hand, upon papyrus". Josiah Quincy said that upon a meeting with Smith, "some parchments inscribed with hieroglyphics were then offered us. They were preserved under glass and handled with great respect. 'That is the handwriting of Abraham, the father of the Faithful,' said the prophet."

Smith began the translation of the Book of Abraham as early as July 1835, and completed through Abraham 2:19 by the end of that year. The rest was most likely completed in early 1842. When translating the book, Smith dictated, and Warren Parrish, Phelps, and Frederick G. Williams served as his scribes. The complete work was first published serially in Times and Seasons in 1842, and it was later canonized in 1880 by the LDS Church as part of its Pearl of Great Price.

The papyrus and mummies were presumed lost in the Great Chicago Fire in 1871, but 11 sections of the papyri were rediscovered in the New York Metropolitan Museum of Art in 1966 and acquired by the LDS Church. Three of these fragments were designated Joseph Smith Papyri (JSP) I, X, and XI. Other fragments, designated JSP II, IV, V, VI, VII, and VIII, are thought by critics to be the Book of Joseph to which Smith referred when first examining the text. A twelfth fragment was discovered in the LDS Church Historian's office and was dubbed the "Church Historian's Fragment". Disclosed by the church in 1968, the fragment was designated JSP IX by scholars. Although there is some debate about how much of the papyrus collection is missing, there is broad agreement that the recovered papyri are indeed portions of Smith's original purchase, partly based on the fact that they were pasted onto paper which had "drawings of a temple and maps of the Kirtland, Ohio area" on the back, as well as the fact that they were accompanied by an affidavit by Emma Smith, stating that they had been in the possession of Joseph Smith.

Analysis and translation of the papyrus by Egyptologists

In November 1967, the LDS Church asked Hugh Nibley, a professor of ancient scripture at Brigham Young University (BYU), to study the fragments. Although competent in numerous languages, Nibley did not have a working knowledge of the ancient Egyptian script or language at the time, so he studied under the University of Chicago professor John A. Wilson so that he could translate the papyri himself.

The LDS Church published sepia photographs of the papyri in its magazine Improvement Era in February 1968. Although a translation was not provided by the church at this time, soon thereafter the editors of an independent quarterly journal Dialogue: A Journal of Mormon Thought published their own translation after consulting with several Egyptologists and scholars, including: Klaus Baer, a researcher at the University of Chicago's Oriental Institute; Richard Anthony Parker, the Director of the Department of Egyptology at Brown University; Jerald Tanner, an independent scholar; and John A. Wilson, the director of the Oriental Institute. Since 1968, numerous other translations have also been published by Mormon and non-Mormon scholars, including Michael D. Rhodes (BYU), John Gee (BYU), and Robert K. Ritner (University of Chicago).

The translation by both Mormon and non-Mormon Egyptologists is completely at odds with Joseph Smith's purported translation. The transliterated text from the recovered papyri and facsimiles published in the Book of Abraham contain no direct referenceseither historical or textualto Abraham at all, and the patriarch's name does not appear anywhere on the papyri or the facsimiles. Edward Ashment notes, "The sign that Smith identified with Abraham ... is nothing more than the hieratic version of ... a 'w' in Egyptian. It has no phonetic or semantic relationship to [Smith's] 'Ah-broam. BYU scholar Michael Rhodes summarized the content of the papyri as follows:

The Hor Book of Breathings" is a part of eleven papyri fragments ... from three separate papyri scrolls. Joseph Smith Papyri I, X, and XI are from the Book of Breathings belonging to Hor (Hr) the son of Usirwer. Joseph Smith Papyri II, IV, V, VI, VII, and IX all came from a Book of the Dead belonging to Tshemmim (Ts-sri.t Min.), the daughter of Eskhons (Ns-Hnsw). Finally, Joseph Smith Papyrus III is part of Chapter 125 of the Book of the Dead belonging to Neferirtnub (Nfr-ir(.t)-nbw).

Examining JSP I, Egyptologist Klaus Baer translated the writing on the right of the vignette as follows:

[T]he prophet of Amonrasonter, prophet [?] of Min Bull-of-his-Mother, prophet [?] of Khons the Governor ... Hor, justified, son of the holder of the same titles, master of secrets, and purifier of the gods Osorwer, justified [?] ... Tikhebyt, justified. May your ba live among them, and may you be buried in the West ... May you give him a good, splendid burial on the West of Thebes just like ...

The hieratic text found to the left of the vignette (i.e. the "Small Sensen" text) on JSP I was initially translated by Parker. His translation is as follows:

[T]his great pool of Khonsu [Osiris Hor, justified], born of Taykhebyt, a man likewise. After (his) two arms are [fast]ened to his breast, one wraps the Book of Breathings, which is with writing both inside and outside of it, with royal linen, it being placed (at) his left arm near his heart, this having been done at his wrapping and outside it. If this book be recited for him, then he will breathe like the soul[s of the gods] for ever and ever.

Scholars have dated the Joseph Smith Papyri to the late Ptolemaic period ( 150 BC), 1500 years after Abraham's supposed lifetime. This fact—combined with the presence of apparent anachronisms within the book itself—seems to contradict Smith's statements that the papyri feature the "handwriting of Abraham" which had been "written by his own hand".

Sources

Egyptologists have concluded that the papyri fragments were originally part of the following sources:

Manuscript-based criticism

The "Egyptian Alphabet and Grammar"

Several criticisms of the Book of Abraham have been brought forth that hinge on evidence found in the "Egyptian Alphabet and Grammar". One such argument focuses on the aforementioned document and its connection to Joseph Smith Papyrus XI, also known as the "Small Sensen" papyrus (i.e. the small scrap of papyrus attached to left side of JSP I). Several pages in the "Egyptian Alphabet and Grammar" contain an arrangement of correlated characters from the Small Sensen papyrus. These pages are divided into two halves: on the left-hand side of a given page, Egyptian characters are listed, and on the right side, an apparent translation of these characters is given. This suggests that whoever created the correlation was attempting to perform a direct, literal, and comprehensive translation (as opposed to a merely spiritual or divined translation, as some apologists contend) of the figures of the papyri scraps.

While the "Egyptian Alphabet and Grammar" only contains an explicit correlation between Egyptian characters and their purported English translation for –2:9, the document itself suggests that the hieroglyphs from the Small Sensen papyrus were used to translate much of the Book of Abraham. The characters from which our present Book of Abraham was translated are down to the left-hand column and Joseph Smith's translation opposite, so we know approximately how much material was translated from each character."

This correlation found in the "Egyptian Alphabet and Grammar" between Abraham 1:11–2:9 and the Small Sensen papyrus has thus led many critics to assert that all of the Book of Abraham text came entirely from Smith's interpretation of the Small Sensen papyrus, rather than a hypothetical lost section (as is often asserted by apologists). This means, however, that Smith would have used a single Egyptian character to derive dozens of words, as Jerald Tanner notes: "Joseph Smith apparently translated many English words from each Egyptian character. The characters from fewer than four lines of the papyrus make up forty-nine verses of the Book of Abraham, containing more than two thousand words. If Joseph Smith continued to translate the same number of English words from each Egyptian character, this one small fragment would complete the entire text of the Book of Abraham. In other words, the small piece of papyrus [i.e. the fragment known as Fragment XI] appears to be the whole Book of Abraham!"

The facsimiles

Early criticism of the facsimiles

In 1856, Gustav Seyffarth viewed the Joseph Smith Papyri at the St. Louis Museum, making the following statement regarding them: "The papyrus roll is not a record but an invocation to the Deity Osirus , in which occurs the name of the person, and a picture of the attendant spirits, introducing the dead to the Judge, Osiris." Later that same year, a pamphlet containing the Book of Abraham's facsimiles was sent to the Louvre. Here, Theodule Deveria, an Egyptologist at the museum, had the opportunity to examine the facsimiles, which he recognized as "common Egyptian funerary documents, of which he had examined hundreds." He argued that many of the hieroglyphic characters had been poorly transcribed and that several areas in the facsimiles seemed to have been reconstructed based on guesswork. Deveria consequently concluded that Joseph Smith's explanation was "rambling nonsense". Despite this condemnation, the LDS Church did not respond to Deveria's critiques at the time. Then, in 1873, Deveria's interpretation, juxtaposed with Smith's interpretation, was published in T. B. H. Stenhouse's book The Rocky Mountain Saints: A Full and Complete History of the Mormons, a work critical of the LDS Church. This time, the church responded by reiterating that the Book of Mormon was divinely inspired, and that the Book of Abraham's source papyri had "two meanings" (one that was obvious and easily understood by a lay audience, and another that was more esoteric and only accessible to the priesthood). In 1880, the Book of Abraham was officially canonized by the Church.

Several decades later, in 1912, Episcopal Bishop Franklin S. Spalding sent copies of the three facsimiles to eight Egyptologists and semitists, soliciting their interpretation of the facsimiles; the results were published in a pamphlet entitled, Joseph Smith, Jr. as a Translator: An Inquiry. The eight scholars wrote that the images were taken from standard funerary documents, and some of the scholars even harshly criticized Smith's interpretation. Egyptologist James H. Breasted of the University of Chicago, for instance, noted: "[T]hese three facsimiles of Egyptian documents in the 'Pearl of Great Price' depict the most common objects in the Mortuary religion of Egypt. Joseph Smith's interpretations of them as part of a unique revelation through Abraham, therefore, very clearly demonstrates that he was totally unacquainted with the significance of these documents and absolutely ignorant of the simplest facts of Egyptian writing and civilization." Flinders Petrie of London University wrote: "It may be safely said that there is not one single word that is true in these explanations". Finally, Archibald Sayce, Oxford professor of Egyptology, stated: "It is difficult to deal seriously with Joseph Smith's impudent fraud ... Smith has turned the goddess [Isis in Facsimile No. 3] into a king and Osiris into Abraham."

Once again, the LDS Church defended the legitimacy of the book, this time by arguing that these scholars were employing improper methods and faulty reasoning. LDS apologists argued that, because many of the Egyptian experts had pointed out that the facsimiles were reminiscent of similar documents, or that certain areas on the facsimiles appeared different from known funerary texts, these scholars were merely ignoring potentially key differences in the facsimiles so that their arguments might seem effective. Such a line of reasoning is exemplified by a note written by Church historian B. H. Roberts: "Yes, or some other change might be suggested, and by such a process some other meaning may be read into the place and make it different from the translation of Joseph Smith." The Church eventually hired an individual named Robert C. Webb (the pen name of J. E. Homans), to defend the veracity of the Book of Abraham. In his 1915 work The Case Against Mormonism (in which he claimed to have a PhD, despite this being a lie), he collected several interpretations of Facsimile No. 1 from Egyptologists that sounded unrelated to the layperson (i.e. that the facsimile represented: "an embalming", "the Resurrection of Osiris", or "Anubis guarding the embalmed mummy") and claimed: "If any of these Egyptologists is right, therefore, this drawing must have been radically altered in several essential particulars. In view of their disagreements, it will be necessary to demonstrate any conclusions drawn. Will some learned person be pleased to tell us what this scene represents? Otherwise, how can we condemn Joseph Smith for 'fraud'...?"

Facsimile No. 1
Joseph Smith claimed that Facsimile No. 1 portrays Abraham on an altar, about to be sacrificed by an "idolatrous priest of Elkenah". The Book of Abraham makes explicit reference to this facsimile, noting: "That you may have a knowledge of this altar, I will refer you to the representation at the commencement of this record." Egyptologists, however, point out that it is a vignette taken from a version of The Book of Breathings, also known as the "Breathing Permit", copied for a Theban priest named Hôr. A comparison of Smith's interpretation of the facsimile, and that of Egyptologists is as follows:

Facsimile No. 2

Joseph Smith claimed that Facsimile No. 2 was a representations of celestial objects. Egyptologists, however, argue that the figure represented by Facsimile No. 2 is a common Egyptian artifact called a hypocephalus. Hypocephali were placed under the head or feet of the mummified person to magically protect the deceased, causing the head and body to be enveloped in light and warmth. The hypocephalus in question was prepared for an individual named Sheshonq. A comparison of Smith's interpretation of the facsimile, and that of Egyptologists is as follows:

Facsimile No. 3
Joseph Smith interpreted Facsimile No. 3 as representing Abraham sitting on the Pharaoh's throne teaching the principles of astronomy to the Egyptian court. Egyptologists, however, interpret this as a scene from the 125th chapter of The Book of the Dead, in which the deceased person for whom the scroll was made is presented before the Egyptian god Osiris. Surrounding Hôr and Osiris are the goddess Maat, the god Anubis, and the goddess Isis. Hieroglyphics at the bottom of the scroll identify Hôr, the deceased. It is likely that this vignette appeared at the end of the same papyrus scroll that featured the vignette which served as the basis for Facsimile No. 1. A comparison of Smith's interpretation of the facsimile, and that of Egyptologists is as follows:

Questionable reconstruction of lacunae

Several Egyptologists, including Deveria, Klaus Baer, Richard Anthony Parker, and Albert Lythgoe noted that portions of Facsimile No. 1 appeared to be incorrectly depicted—based on comparison with other similar Egyptian vignettes—and suspected that they had been reconstructed from lacunae (i.e. gaps) in the original papyri; Larson notes, "[S]ome elements in several of the drawings appeared to Deveria to be guesswork, probably incorrect restorations of missing sections of the original papyri." Indeed, when the original papyri were later discovered, a comparison of the facsimiles with the papyri and the Kirtland Egyptian Papers revealed that the areas on Facsimile No. 1 which Egyptologists claim look modified (e.g. the heads of "the idolatrous priest" and the "angel of the Lord", the priest's knife) are the same sections that are missing from the extant fragment (i.e. Fragment I). This lent credence to the Egyptologists' conclusions that Smith filled in these areas himself.

Egyptologists have also criticized Facsimile No. 2 for containing false reconstruction of lacunae, suggesting that Smith reconstructed portions of the vignette with characters from another papyrus. Critics note that an incomplete version of Facsimile No. 2 is found among the Kirtland Egyptian Papers, part of which are in Smith's handwriting. Comparing the published version of Facsimile No. 2 with the version from the Kirtland Egyptian Papers and the newly rediscovered papyri reveals that characters from a different papyrus fragment were used to fill in the missing portions of Facsimile No. 2. Michael Rhodes notes:

A careful examination of Facsimile No. 2 shows that there is a difference between most of the hieroglyphic signs and the signs on the right third of the figure on the outer edge as well as the outer portions of the sections numbered 12–15. These signs are hieratic, not hieroglyphic, and are inverted, or upside down, to the rest of the text. In fact, they are a fairly accurate copy of lines 2, 3, and 4 of the Joseph Smith Papyrus XI, which contains a portion of the Book of Breathings. Especially clear is the word snsn, in section 14, and part of the name of the mother of the owner of the papyrus, (tay-)uby.t, repeated twice on the outer edge. An ink drawing of the hypocephalus in the Church Historian's office shows these same areas as being blank. It is likely that these portions were missing from the original hypocephalus and someone (e.g., the engraver, one of Joseph Smith's associates, or Joseph himself) copied the lines from the Book of Breathings papyrus for aesthetic purposes.

Apologist responses to criticism of the facsimiles
Latter-day Saint Egyptologist John Gee, counters the idea that Smith reconstructed the lacunae by claiming that eyewitnesses of the papyri during Smith's lifetime described a complete document, free of lacunae. Thus, Gee argues that the facsimile is an accurate reproduction of an original document that has since suffered significant damage. Gee gives as an example "the man with a drawn knife", a portion that is no longer extant but was reported in both apologetic and critical writings of the time.

Some apologists also believe that there are differences between the vignette and other comparable vignettes that render the standard interpretation incorrect. Apologists have also challenged the Egyptologists' means of successfully interpreting the facsimiles, arguing that the papyrus had been written, not for future Egyptologists or even contemporary Egyptians, but rather for Egyptian Jews. These apologists contend that the papyri may have been created by a Jewish redactor, adapting Egyptian religious sources, but imbuing them with new Semitic religious context. Apologists give examples of such Jewish adaptations to help explain how the facsimiles can support Smith's possible translation of the book. Mormon apologists also allege the assertion that Smith's reconstructions were flawedan assertion that has been put forth by several Egyptologistsis mere speculation that fallaciously presupposes that the Egyptologist interpretation is correct. These apologists therefore assert that Smith's reconstruction was either correct, was done so as to make the images more aesthetically pleasing, or was inconsequential to the original interpretation of the Book of Abraham.

Hugh Nibley of Brigham Young University notes that the seemingly misidentified characters in Facsimile No. 3 may have been participating in a ritual where both men and women can be represented by the opposite sex. Nibley also argues that Smith's interpretation of the facsimile avoids making "romantic and quite unjustified conclusions" (e.g. identifying the seated person as Pharaoh, identifying the two feminine figures as Pharaoh's wife and daughter, or as Abraham's wife Sarah); instead, Nibley contends that Smith's interpretation of the facsimile is consistent with modern understandings of "the court scenes on other biographical or autobiographical records" (for instance, that the figure in the center of a stele is usually the owner or "usually some personal servant or palace officer attendant on Pharaoh", and that Smith indeed identified one of the central figure as a servant-cum-waiter named Shulem).

Apologists also cite parallels between the scenes depicted on the facsimiles and several ancient documents and other Jewish writings, maintaining that there is no evidence that Smith studied or even had access to these sources. Examples include: the attempted sacrifice of Abraham and his subsequent rescue (a similar story was preserved in a Coptic encomium only translated into English in the 20th century), Abraham teaching the Egyptians astronomy (this is recounted in the aforementioned Coptic encomium, and is mentioned by Eusebius, quoting Pseudo-Eupolemus, in his work Praeparatio evangelica), and God teaching astronomy to Abraham.

Historicity
The historicity of the Book of Abraham is not accepted by non-LDS scholars and by some LDS scholars. The existence of the patriarch Abraham is questioned even in the Biblical narrative by some researchers. Various anachronism and 19th century themes lead scholars to conclude that the Book of Abraham is a 19th century creation.

Anachronisms
Biblical scholars place Abraham living no later than 1500 BCE, making anything coming into existence after that time anachronistic. LDS Church scholars either reject the anachronisms, or accept the anachronisms and attribute them to either Joseph Smith and/or an ancient Jewish redactor, who while copying from the original Book of Abraham replaced original terms and images with concepts that would be understandable to a contemporary audience.  This includes the facsimiles that are found in the Book of Abraham, which represent a corrupted version of a document originally written by Abraham, and Smith gave the interpretation of the original document. In response to criticism that the documents are too young to have been written by Abraham, Nibley and others argue that the papyri may be copies of an original which was either written or commissioned personally by Abraham, and thus the copies could be considered "by [Abraham's] own hand" in the sense that they were derived from an original. Critics of this approach point to repeated statements by Smith and others that the papyri he was translating from were literally written in the handwriting of Abraham and Joseph.

Depiction of angels
Biblical scholars argue that the concept of an "Angel" as benevolent semi-divine beings as portrayed in the Book of Abraham did not develop in Judaism until the post-exilic period.

Documentary dependence
Biblical scholars agree that the book of Genesis is not a unified work from a single author, but is made up of Judean sources combined over many centuries by many hands, some of them over 1,000 years after Abraham. The dependence of the creation account found in the Book of Abraham on these late sources render it anachronistic.

Egyptus

The Book of Abraham states that Egypt was discovered by a daughter of Ham named "Egyptus, which in the Chaldean signifies Egypt, which signifies that which is forbidden. When this woman discovered the land it was under water, who afterward settled her sons in it." Her sons went on to become the Pharaohs of Egypt. The word "Egyptus" is a Greek word, not Chaldean and means, "the house of the ka of Ptah" referring to the Temple of Ptah in Memphis. It does not mean "forbidden" in any language.

Facsimile #2 (Hypocephalus)
Facsimile #2 is an Egyptian funerary document called a Hypocephalus. These objects, which were placed under the head of the deceased and symbolized the eye of a deity, first came into use  400301 B.C., well after Abraham would have lived.

LDS Scholar Royal Skousen has argued that Smith made a mistake when he connected the facsimiles to the revealed text. For Skousen, sentences referencing the facsimiles were interlinear or margin notes that were not part of the actual revealed text. As such, he believes the facsimiles themselves are not part of the Book of Abraham and are extracanonical.

Human sacrifice as an Egyptian religious practice
The Book of Abraham discusses men, women and children being sacrificed to Egyptian gods for religious reasons, such as a child as a thank offering. The sacrifices were said to be done "after the manner of the Egyptians."

Offering human sacrifice to Gods was not a religious practice of the ancient Egyptians. LDS Egyptologist Kerry Muhlestein has argued that ritual killing did occur in ancient Egypt as punishment for religious dissent. Critics of this approach argue that religious ritual surrounding political capital punishment is fundamentally different than ritual surrounding religious human sacrifices such as making thank offerings of children to Gods as depicted in the Book of Abraham.

Pharaoh

The Book of Abraham uses the word Pharaoh as the proper name of the first Egyptian king that means "king by royal blood". The word Pharaoh initially meant "great house" and was not used as a title for a King until around 1500 B.C.

Prophetic figure writing scripture
LDS Scholar David Bokovoy writes in arguing that the Book of Abraham should be read as inspired pseudepigrapha, "The notion of an ancient prophetic figure or patriarch writing scripture is historically anachronistic. Though traces of Moses as author exist in the Book of Deuteronomy, this view of scripture did not develop fully in Judean thought until the Hellenistic era (321–31BC)."

Potiphar's Hill
The Book of Abraham says that Abraham was taken to be sacrificed at a place called "Potiphar's Hill". The name "Potiphar" is of Late Egyptian origin and grammatical construction and means "the one whom Re has given" using a form of Re's name with the definite article ("Pre") that did not exist in Abraham's day. The name is unknown before the 11th century BCE and is also considered anachronistic in the Bible. Sumerologist Christopher Woods wrote that the name Potiphar "has no place linguistically or culturally in the toponymy of southern or northern Mesopotamia."

Sephardic Hebrew
The Book of Abraham contains a number of Hebrew words, several of them with clear Sephardi Hebrew influence, a dialect that originated with Jews in medieval Europe. Hebrew itself was not a written language until around the tenth century BCE.

Ur of the Chaldees

The opening chapter of the Book of Abraham takes place in "land of Ur, of Chaldea". The location of Ur has been debated by historians, however the qualifier of "Chaldea" firmly places Ur in southern Mesopotamia. While fragments of Egyptian vessels and other items found indicate trade between Mesopotamia and Egypt, there is no evidence that Egyptian religion was ever practiced in either Northern or Southern Mesopotamia, or in any way displaced local religious traditions. Additionally, the Chaldeans did not exist as a people until the 9th century BCwell after the purported time of Abraham.

Arguments for Historicity

Leiden papyrus

In a 2013 essay on the Book of Abraham, the LDS Church argued for the historicity of the Book of Abraham by citing as evidence "a third-century papyrus from an Egyptian temple library connects Abraham with an illustration similar to facsimile 1 in the book of Abraham." The damaged papyrus written in Greek is a love spell designed to create feelings of passion in a woman. The broken text has been translated as:

...you bring a sealed ... of copper ... this lion, this mummy (?), and this Anubis ... while they seek ... black scarab (?) ... put ... "...AIDIO ORICH THAMBITO, Abraham who at ... PLANOIEGCHIBIOTH MOU and the whole soul for her, <person> [who <person> bore] ... the female body of her, <person> [whom <person> bore], I conjure by the ... [and] to inflame her, <person> whom [<person> bore]." [Write these] words together with this picture on a new papyrus:

Critics have countered that the lion couch scene on the Leiden papyrus originated well after the Jewish diaspora when Jewish ideas were spread throughout the Mediterranean world, the word Abraham was commonly used in magic spells as an "abracadabra"-type magic word, and that the person on the lion couch scene is the woman who is the target of the passion spell, not Abraham.

Literary dependence

King James Version of the Bible
The Book of Abraham contains a creation story similar to Genesis chapters 1 and 2. The Book of Abraham retains 75 percent of the wording of the King James Version of the Bible. The creation account found in both the Book of Abraham and King James Version has a literary dependence on late Judean sources. The Book of Abraham in several places further combines two documents (the Priestly source and Jahwist source), indicating that the Book of Abraham depends on the King James Version, and not the other way around.

Hebrew studies

In early 1836 Joseph Smith and other leading Latter Day Saints paid Hebrew teacher Joshua Seixas to teach Hebrew.  Seixas had created materials with a distinctive Sephardic transliteration system that was different than what was being taught elsewhere. Most distinct were the pronunciations for vowels and gutturals such as "au" used for qametz "ee" for hireq and "ng" for ayin.

The creation story in the Book of Abraham and explanations of the facsimiles contain numerous Hebrew vocabulary words spelled using the unique transliteration system taught by Seixas. Smith did not conceal that Hebrew was incorporated in the text of the Book of Abraham, rather he openly acknowledged it. Smith, like many scholars and theologians of his day believed that Hebrew and Egyptian were related, and close to the pure language spoken by Adam in the Garden of Eden.

Hebrew influence on the creation account
The Book of Abraham chapters 4 and 5 retains about 75 percent of the wording from the King James translation of Genesis 1 and 2. The remaining 25 percent shows heavy influence from Smith's Hebrew studies under Seixas. For instance, Smith's choice to render רָקִיעַ (which is traditionally translated as "firmament") as "expanse" reflected an early 19th century movement (and one that Seixas endorsed) to use a more scientific term. Similarly, Smith rendered what was traditionally translated as "moved upon the face of the waters" to "brooding upon the faces of the water", which reflected Seixas and other contemporary commentators' preferred rendering of the word. Some changes were grammatical in nature, such as changing divided to caused it to be divided. The Hebrew  means "and it was" or "and it came to pass" and is left off in the King James Version of the Bible, but appears in Seixas translation and also throughout the Book of Abraham. During his time working with Seixas, Smith was using Joshua Seixas's A Manual Hebrew Grammar for the Use of Beginners (1834) as a textbook, and he may have also read Wilhelm Gesenius's A Hebrew and English Lexicon of the Old Testament (1824).

Two Hebrew translations in the Book of Abraham had a theological impact. Normally translated as singular, in the Book of Abraham the word Elohim is translated to be plural "the Gods". The -im (-) ending on many Hebrew words makes it plural similar to how an 's' at the end of some English nouns makes the word plural. Smith explained his reasoning for the translation in an 1844 discourse, saying that he "once asked a learned Jew ... if the Hebrew language compels us to render all words ending in heam in the plural-why not render the first plural-he replied it would ruin the Bible-he acknowledged I was right." Of note, Gesenius's lexicon does note that Elohim can be translated in the plural but that in Genesis 1:1 it is singular.

The second theologically impactful translation was different than that suggested by Seixas, but followed the Gesenius lexicon. The words "create" and "to make" were translated as "to organize" and "to form" in keeping with Latter Day Saint theology against creation from nothing.

1833 Patriarchal Blessing
The note discusses the events that Cowdery said led to his being given the Melchizedek priesthood by angels. Richard Lloyd Anderson wrote that "the entry originated December 13, 1833", and was "the earliest known account of priesthood restoration." In suggesting that the papyri was a catalyst, BYU Professor James Harris wrote, "The near identical wording of these passages would indicate that some of the text of the Book of Abraham was revealed and recorded before the Abraham papyri came into the possession of Joseph Smith."

Historian Dan Vogel has argued that the dependency is the other way around, that Cowdery was influenced by the Book of Abraham when writing his note. He points out that Cowdery was called as the primary scribe for patriarchal blessings around September 1835 and probably added the note when he copied the earlier blessing into the patriarchal blessing book.

Thomas Dick's A Philosophy of a Future State
The Book of Abraham has a section on astronomy discussing the throne of God as being the center of the Universe, and "intelligences" (souls) that God created, who progressed eternally. Several historians, including Fawn M. Brodie, have argued that these ideas came directly from Thomas Dick and his popular book A Philosophy of a Future State, which similarly discusses grades of "intelligences" created by God who eternally progress, and a system of astronomy with God's throne at the very center. Sidney Rigdon quoted from Dick's book in 1836, Oliver Cowdery published a passage of the book in the Messenger and Advocate, and in January 1844 Smith himself donated his copy of Dick's book to the Nauvoo library in 1844. That said, the historian John L. Brooke notes that there are several other contemporary sources besides Dick that could have been the source of inspiration for the Book of Abraham. LDS historian Benjamin Park similarly notes that the direct link to Dick is tenuous and the ideas could have come from the cultural milieu.

Pure language project

Throughout Joseph Smith's ministry he had an interest in the language spoken by Adam in the Garden of Eden, which he considered "pure and undefiled". Smith believed that Egyptian and Hebrew were closely related to the pure language. In 1832 Smith received a revelation restoring various Adamic words. In May 1835, a few months before purchasing the papyri, Smith's scribe W.W. Phelps wrote a letter to his wife detailing a list of pure language terms, which were also included in an Egyptian alphabet document a few months later.

The Book of Abraham includes two terms that are neither Egyptian nor Hebrew, shinehah and olea translated as "sun" and "moon" respectively. Both terms appear in an 1838 revelation in the context of another pure language word Adam-ondi-ahman, indicating that they are also pure language terms.

Ethics

Black people and the curse of Ham

In the Book of Abraham, Pharaoh and his lineage are denied the priesthood because they are descendants of Ham through Canaan who was cursed. The belief that black people were descendants of Ham was a popular antebellum belief, and early Latter Day Saints were predisposed to read the text in this context. When combined with verses from the Book of Moses which associated the curse of Canaan with blackness, the Book of Abraham was used by LDS leaders as early as 1845 to justify anti-black practices in the LDS Church, such as priesthood denial and policies against interracial marriage.

In 2013 the LDS Church released a statement, "Black servitude was sometimes viewed as a second curse placed upon Noah's grandson Canaan as a result of Ham's indiscretion toward his father. ... Today, the Church disavows the theories advanced in the past that black skin is a sign of divine disfavor or curse." The modern position by the LDS Church is that the passage has been misinterpreted, and it is more about priesthood lineage determined by birth order, not racial lineage.

Use of pagan symbols
A religious criticism by Charles M. Larson is that because God rebuked and punished the Israelites anytime they lapsed into paganism or mingled with the followers of other deities, and because the New Testament claims that "God does not use pagan or ungodly vessels to bear his Truth," the claim that the Book of Abraham was found in Egyptian (that is, pagan) religious documents conflicts directly with what is written in the Bible.

Defense of the book
A number of theories have been presented in defense of the official LDS Church position that the work is a revelation from God, through Joseph Smith, which tells a true story of actual events from the life of Abraham. The most common of these arguments is that Smith interpreted the documents by revelation, rather than a standard "translation" of text from one language to another, in a process similar to his translation of the Bible. In 2014, the LDS Church published an essay on its website which acknowledged that Joseph Smith's notes concerning the meaning of the Egyptian characters are inconsistent with "those recognized by Egyptologists today" and that "Mormon and non-Mormon Egyptologists agree that the characters on the fragments do not match the translation given in the book of Abraham." However, the essay points out that it was not uncommon for ancient Egyptian vignettes to be placed some distance from their associated commentary, thus text adjacent to and surrounding facsimile 1 may not be a source for the text of the Book of Abraham. The essay concluded that "the truth of the Book of Abraham is ultimately found through careful study of its teachings, sincere prayer, and the confirmation of the Spirit" and "cannot be settled by scholarly debate concerning the book's translation and historicity."

Other apologetic arguments do not deny the meaning of the papyri as determined by Egyptologists, but in addition propose that the hieroglyphic text has some hidden meaning. Some apologists argue that there are other messages and meanings embedded in the text along with the Egyptologist's translations that are unknown to us. For many years, Hugh Nibley, for instance, preferred the argument that the Sensen text has two meanings: one that can be determined by standard translation (a "literal translation"), and another (a "secret meaning") that can only be divined, possibly with the help of a tool like the Urim and Thummim or one of the seer stones that Joseph Smith purportedly used to translate the Book of Mormon. Similarly, Richley Crapo and John Tvedtnes proposed that the Sensen text may have merely been a mnemonic device, used "to bring to mind 'a set number of memorized phrases relating to Abraham's account of his life. Crapo and Tvedtnes argued that, were one to compare the literal meaning of the hieroglyphic characters found in the Sensen text with the Book of Abraham, certain parallels could be found; for instance, the first hieroglyph found the in Sensen text means "this", and Crapo and Tvedtnes pointed out that the opening of  reads, "Now this priest had offered..." This argument was popular within LDS circles, but Klaus Baer criticized it because the supposed parallels offered were "related by no visible principle" and instead seemed to have been made ad hoc.

In regards to the connection between the Sensen text and the Kirtland Egyptian Papers, some argue that a relationship exists only because the latter is a product of Smith's scribes (as opposed to Smith himself), who, out of personal curiosity, were trying to reverse-engineer the meaning of the Egyptian hieroglyphs. In other words, this hypothesis posits that the scribes wrote down the characters from the Sensen text and then, via speculation, attempted to match the characters with what had been revealed to Smith. However, Smith's own diary entries (as collected in the History of the Church) record that in July 1835, he was "continually engaged in translating an alphabet to the Book of Abraham", which suggests Smith was actively involved in the creation of the Kirtland Egyptian Papers, thus weakening this apologetic hypothesis.

It has also been argued that the methodology used by modern Egyptologists to translate ancient records is unreliable and unstable, and therefore produces flawed and nonsensical translations. Thus, the modern translations of the Joseph Smith Papyri as produced by Egyptologists are not to be trusted. This line of thinking was used by Nibley in his 1975 book, The Message of the Joseph Smith Papyri. He wrote: "To the often asked question, 'Have the Joseph Smith Papyri been translated?' The answer is an emphatic no! What, then, is the foregoing? A mechanical transcription, no more ... What we have is a transmission rather than a translation of the text ... Though as correct and literal as we can make it, the translation in the preceding chapter is not a translation. It is nonsense."

Finally, it has been proposed that the remaining papyrus fragments are only part of the complete original papyri. Contemporary accounts refer to "a long roll" or multiple "rolls" of papyrus. In 1968, Keith C. Terry and Walter Whipple estimated that the fragments constituted roughly one-third of Smith's original collection of papyri. Later, in 2000, Mormon Egyptologist John Gee provided a graphical comparison of the relative extent of the known fragments to other complete examples of similar scrolls, which indicated the total at about twenty percent. Others, however, have challenged this notion, contending that the majority of the papyri have been recovered. Andrew Cook and Christopher Smith, for example, argue that, based on a physical analysis of fragments from the scroll of Hôr, only  could be missing from that scroll. This contrasts with an LDS scholar's earlier estimate for the length of the missing portion. Still others have suggested that fragments may have only been a starting point for reconstruction.

See also

 Mormon cosmology
 Criticism of the Latter Day Saint movement
 Criticism of Mormon sacred texts
 Kirtland Egyptian Papers

Notes

References

Footnotes

Bibliography

External links

 Translation and Historicity of the Book of Abraham, from the LDS Church website
 Joseph Smith Papers Project Egyptian Material
 Dialogue: A Journal of Mormon Thought, an independent Mormon journal with scholarly works on the Book of Abraham

Egyptology
Pearl of Great Price (Mormonism)
Book of Abraham
Book of Abraham